The East Lancashire Regiment was, from 1881 to 1958, a line infantry regiment of the British Army. The regiment was formed in 1881 under the Childers Reforms by the amalgamation of the 30th (Cambridgeshire) Regiment of Foot and 59th (2nd Nottinghamshire) Regiment of Foot with the militia and rifle volunteer units of eastern Lancashire. In 1958 the regiment was amalgamated with the South Lancashire Regiment to form the Lancashire Regiment which was, in 1970, merged with the Loyal Regiment (North Lancashire) to form the Queen's Lancashire Regiment. In 2006, the Queen's Lancashire was further amalgamated with the King's Own Royal Border Regiment and the King's Regiment (Liverpool and Manchester) to form the present Duke of Lancaster's Regiment (King's, Lancashire and Border).

History

Formation and service to 1914

Regular battalions

The 1st Battalion was formed from the 30th (Cambridgeshire) Regiment of Foot (raised in 1702) and the 2nd Battalion from the 59th (2nd Nottinghamshire) Regiment of Foot (raised 1755) and the regiment was renamed the East Lancashire Regiment in July 1881.

Under the system introduced in 1881, one battalion of each infantry regiment was to serve at a home station while the other was in a foreign garrison or on active service. Due to the emergency caused by the outbreak of war in South Africa in 1899 most home service battalions were dispatched to the conflict. The 1st East Lancashire Regiment arrived at Cape Town in early February 1900, and remained posted in South Africa until after the war ended, leaving Cape Town again in November 1902.

Militia and volunteer/territorial battalions
The 1881 reforms also linked the militia and rifle volunteer units of the area into the regimental structure:
 
 The 5th Royal Lancashire Militia was redesignated as the 3rd (Militia) Battalion of the East Lancashire Regiment.
 The 2nd Lancashire Rifle Volunteer Corps, based at Blackburn: renamed to 1st Volunteer Battalion, East Lancashire Regiment in 1889
 The 3rd Lancashire Rifle Volunteer Corps, based at Burnley: renamed to 2nd Volunteer Battalion, East Lancashire Regiment in 1889

The militia was a reserve force that was only liable to service in the United Kingdom and in peace time assembled for period of annual training. In time of war it could be "embodied" or mobilised. When the war that broke out in South Africa in 1899 began to absorb a large amount of the regular army's resources, the terms of service of the militia were altered to allow them to serve in the war. The 3rd Battalion was embodied in January 1900 and served in South Africa until 1902. It was disembodied in March 1902. The battalion was awarded the battle honour "South Africa 1900–1902".

The volunteer battalions were organised for home defence purposes, and their members were subject to regular drills and training. Like the militia battalion, elements of the volunteers fought in South Africa. While members of the Volunteer Force could not be required to serve overseas, members from the battalions were voluntarily formed into Active Service Companies, providing reinforcements for the regular battalion. Both volunteer battalions were awarded battle honours for the war.

1908 reorganisation
In 1908, under the Territorial and Reserve Forces Act 1907 the militia and volunteer force were reconstituted as the "Special Reserve" and "Territorial Force" (TF). Territorial battalions were renumbered in series after the special reserve battalions. The resulting titles were:

 3rd (Special Reserve) Battalion
 4th Battalion (TF) (formerly 1st Volunteer Battalion) at Canterbury Street in Blackburn
 5th Battalion (TF) (formerly 2nd Volunteer Battalion) at Bank Parade in Burnley

The Territorial Force was restructured into 14 infantry divisions, and the 4th and 5th battalions formed part of the East Lancashire Brigade of the East Lancashire Division. It was as part of that division that were to be mobilised in August 1914 after the outbreak of World War I.

First World War

The size of the regiment was increased during the conflict, reaching a total of 17 battalions.

Victoria Crosses

Four members of the regiment were awarded the Victoria Cross for gallantry:
Drummer Spencer John Bent, 1st Battalion (Le Gheer, Belgium, 1 –2 November 1914)
Private William Young, 8th Battalion (Fonquevillers, France, 22 December 1915)
Second Lieutenant Alfred Victor Smith, 1/5th Battalion (Helles, Galliopoli, Turkey, 23 December 1915)
Second Lieutenant Basil Arthur Horsfall, attached to 11th Battalion (Between Moyenneville and Ablainzevelle, France, 21 March 1918)

Inter war
Between the Wars the East Lancs served in many conflicts including Baluchistan, Afghanistan, Ireland, Turkey, Palestine and the North West Frontier of India.

Second World War
The East Lancashire Regiment was again increased in size for the duration of the Second World War, although not to such an extent as in 1914–1918. Firstly, prior to the outbreak of hostilities in 1939, the entire Territorial Army was doubled in size, with each unit forming a duplicate. Secondly, a number of wartime battalions were formed.

Victoria Cross
Captain Harold Marcus Ervine-Andrews of the 1st Battalion was awarded the Victoria Cross for gallantry at Dunkirk on 31 May – 1 June 1940.

Post war
In 1948 the regiment was reduced to a single regular battalion. They served in the Middle East, Malaya, the Suez Canal Zone, India and Aden.

In 1957 defence cuts were announced that significantly reduced the size of the army. As a result, the East Lancashire Regiment was amalgamated with The South Lancashire Regiment on 1 July 1958 to form The Lancashire Regiment (Prince of Wales's Volunteers). In 1970 the Lancashire Regiment was in turn amalgamated with the Loyal Regiment (North Lancashire) to form the Queen's Lancashire Regiment. In 2006 the Queen's Lancashire Regiment was merged with the King's Own Royal Border Regiment and King's Regiment (Liverpool and Manchester) to form a new large regiment, the Duke of Lancaster's Regiment (King's, Lancashire and Border).

Regimental museum
The Lancashire Infantry Museum is based at Fulwood Barracks in Preston.

Badges
When the two regiments of foot merged in 1881, new badges were designed that would endure for the rest of the regiment's existence, subject to changes in the style of crown, and which would be worn on the later service dress and battle dress uniforms. The headdress badge selected for the centre of the full dress helmet was a sphinx upon a plinth inscribed "EGYPT". The sphinx had been awarded to the 30th Foot in 1802 to mark its participation in repelling the French invasion of Egypt. The collar badge selected was the Red Rose of Lancaster to mark the regiment's county affiliation. In 1897 a khaki uniform featuring a slouch hat was introduced, and a metal cap badge was devised for each regiment or corps. The badge of the East Lancs was the sphinx and "Egypt" above the rose, the whole enclosed within a laurel wreath topped by a crown. The laurel wreath had formed part of the insignia of the 59th Foot. A scroll inscribed "EAST LANCASHIRE" at the base of the badge completed the design.

Battle honours
The regiment was awarded the following battle honours (those selected for display on the colour are indicated in bold): 
Earlier wars:
Gibraltar 1704-05, Belle isle, Chitral, South Africa 1900-02
First World War:
Le Cateau, Retreat from Mons, Marne 1914, Aisne 1914, '18, Armentières 1914, Neuve Chapelle, Ypres 1915, '17, '18, St Julien, Frezenberg, Bellewaarde, Aubers, Somme 1916, '18, Albert 1916, '18, Bazentin, Pozières, Le Transloy, Ancre 1916, '18, Arras 1917, '18, Scarpe 1917, '18, Arleux, Oppy, Messines 1917, Pilckem, Langemarck 1917, Polygon Wood, Broodseinde, Poelcapelle, Passchendaele, St Quentin, Bapaume 1918, Rosières, Villers Bretonneux, Lys, Estaires, Hazebrouck, Bailleul, Kemmel, Hindenburg Line, Canal du Nord, Cambrai 1918, Selle, Valenciennes, Sambre, France and Flanders 1914–18, Kosturino, Doiran 1917, '18, Macedonia 1915–18, Helles, Krithia, Suvla, Sari Bair, Gallipoli 1915, Rumani, Egypt 1915–17, Tigris 1916, Kut al Amara 1917, Baghdad, Mesopotamia 1916–17
Second World War:
Defence of Escaut, Dunkirk 1940, Caen, Falaise, Nederrijn, Lower Maas, Ourthe, Rhineland, Reichswald, Weeze, Rhine, Ibbenburen, Aller, North-West Europe 1940 '44-45, Madagascar, North Arakan, Pinwe, Burma 1944-45

Regimental Colonels
Colonels of the regiment were:
1881–1889?: (1st Battalion): Gen. Sir George Vaughan Maxwell, KCB (ex 30th Foot)
1881–1889: (2nd Battalion): Gen. Henry Eyre (ex 59th Foot)
1889–1890: Gen. Sir Edmund Augustus Whitmore, KCB
1890–1913: Lt-Gen. Thomas Henry Pakenham, CB
1913–1920: Lt-Gen. Sir Percy Henry Noel Lake, KCB, KCMG
1920–1932: Maj-Gen. Sir Cecil Lothian Nicholson, KCB, CMG
1932–1944: F.M. Sir John Greer Dill, GCB, CMG, DSO 
1944–1946: Maj-Gen. Hugh Tennent MacMullen, CB, CBE, MC
1946–1956: Brig. James Willie Pendlebury, DSO, MC
1956–1958: Maj-Gen. William Harold Lambert, CB, CBE (to Lancashire Regiment)
''1958: Regiment amalgamated with The South Lancashire Regiment (Prince of Wales's Volunteers) to form The Lancashire Regiment (Prince of Wales's Volunteers)

References

External links

 
Military units and formations established in 1881
Military units and formations in Lancashire
Military units and formations in Preston, Lancashire
Infantry regiments of the British Army
Regiments of the British Army in World War I
Regiments of the British Army in World War II
1881 establishments in the United Kingdom
Military units and formations disestablished in 1958
R